Fritz Erich Schmidt (29 November 1906 – 4 February 1982) was a low-ranking commander in the Schutzstaffel of Nazi Germany and Holocaust perpetrator during World War II. He served  as a guard and driver at the Sonnenstein Euthanasia Centre and at the Bernburg Euthanasia Centre in 1940–41 with the rank of Unterscharführer. Schmidt was transferred to Treblinka extermination camp along with other gassing specialists in 1942. At Treblinka, he was in charge of the engine room feeding exhaust to the gas chambers.

After the closing of the camp in 1943 he was moved to Trieste headquarters of the Operational Zone of the Adriatic Littoral where the Risiera di San Sabba killing centre was being set up. After the war he was arrested by the Allies in Saxony and questioned. In December 1949, he was put on trial for crimes against humanity and sentenced to 9 years in prison (possibly amnestied). He lived in West Germany until his death in 1982.

SS-Oberscharführer Heinrich Matthes, chief of the extermination area at Camp 2 and deputy commandant of Treblinka extermination camp testified later about Schmidt's role in the killing of Jews.

See also
 Max Möller (SS officer), ordinance at Camp 2 Auffanglager in Treblinka

Notes

1906 births
1982 deaths
SS non-commissioned officers
Treblinka extermination camp personnel
German people convicted of crimes against humanity
Holocaust perpetrators in Poland
Aktion T4 personnel